Nolinsk is a town and the administrative center of Nolinsky District in Kirov Oblast, Russia, located on the right bank of the Voya River (Vyatka's tributary),  south of Kirov, the administrative center of the oblast. Population:

History
It was founded in 1668 as Nikolsky pogost, which was later also called the village of Noli. It was granted town status in 1780. In 1940–1957, it was called Molotovsk after Soviet politician and diplomat Vyacheslav Molotov, who was born in the nearby town of Sovetsk.

Administrative and municipal status
Within the framework of administrative divisions, Nolinsk serves as the administrative center of Nolinsky District. As an administrative division, it is incorporated within Nolinsky District as the Town of Nolinsk. As a municipal division, the Town of Nolinsk is incorporated within Nolinsky Municipal District as Nolinskoye Urban Settlement.

References

Notes

Sources

Cities and towns in Kirov Oblast
Nolinsky Uyezd
Populated places established in 1668
1668 establishments in Russia
Renamed localities of Kirov Oblast